This is a list of historically significant items found by metal detecting method, only excluding magnet fishing finds, since magnet fishing is usually considered a distinctively different and separate hobby from traditional metal detecting.

List

Gallery

See also
Treasure hunting

Metal detecting finds
Archaeological artifacts